Richard Knerr (30 June 1925 – 14 January 2008) was an American inventor best known for marketing the Frisbee and Hula hoop.

Career

Wham-O 
In 1948, he co-founded the company Wham-O with Arthur Melin (nicknamed "Spud"). In 1957, an Australian visiting California told them offhand that in his home country, children twirled bamboo hoops around their waists in gym class. Knerr and Melin saw how popular such a toy would be, and soon they were winning rave reviews from school kids for the hollow plastic prototype they had created.

References

External links
The Joy of Silly article in the New York Times
Official Frisbee website by Wham-O, manufacturer of Frisbee brand flying discs
  Obituary in "The Guardian", 7 April 2008

University of Southern California alumni
1925 births
2008 deaths
20th-century American engineers
20th-century American inventors